The rivière de l'Or (in English: Gold River) is a tributary of Grand lac Saint François which constitutes the head lake of the Saint-François River. The course of the "rivière de l'Or" crosses the territory of the municipalities of Adstock (in particular the sector of the former municipality of Saint-Method-de-Frontenac) and of Saint-Joseph-de-Coleraine, in the Les Appalaches Regional County Municipality, in the administrative region of Chaudière-Appalaches, on the South Shore of St. Lawrence River, in Quebec, Canada.

Geography 

The main neighboring watersheds of the Gold River are:
 north side: Bécancour River, Labonté stream;
 east side: Couture brook, Muskrat River, Noire River, Prévost-Gilbert River;
 south side: Grand lac Saint François;
 west side: Ashberham River.

The rivière de l'Or draws its source from Lac du Huit located in the municipality of Adstock, east of the Thetford Mines mining area, east of Bécancour Lake, west of route 269. This lake is located north of eighth rang, in the canton of Thetford and it extends to the tenth Rang. Its mouth is located on the south shore of the lake, at the end of the Baie des Bouleaux.

This lake is a resort paradise.

Then the river resumes its course on  towards the south-west, passing the east of Thetford Mines airport, passing west of Mont Adstock, then crossing the route 267, up to the Quenneville stream (coming from the west). In its last segment, the Gold River flows on  towards the south, passing to the west of the Poudrier Hills, to empty at the bottom of a bay on the north shore of the Grand lac Saint François.

In its lower course, the river constitutes the demarcation between the municipalities of Saint-Joseph-de-Coleraine and Adstock (i.e. the former municipality of Saint-Method-de-Frontenac).

Toponymy 

Formerly, this watercourse was known as the “Goldstream River” in English.

The toponym Rivière de l'Or was officially registered on August 4, 1969, at the Commission de toponymie du Québec.

See also 

 List of rivers of Quebec

References 

Les Appalaches Regional County Municipality
Rivers of Chaudière-Appalaches